Arene ferruginosa is a species of sea snail, a marine gastropod mollusk in the family Areneidae.

Shell size 
The Arene ferruginosa has an average shell size of approximately 7mm.

References

External links
 To ITIS
 To World Register of Marine Species

Areneidae
Gastropods described in 1970